Thomas Ioannou (born 19 July 1995) is a Cypriot footballer who plays as a left back. He signed for AEK Larnaca a 3-year contract in May 2016.

International career
He made his national team debut on 10 October 2020 in a Nations League game against Luxembourg.

References

External links

1995 births
Living people
Cypriot footballers
Cyprus international footballers
Cyprus under-21 international footballers
Cyprus youth international footballers
AEP Paphos FC players
Pafos FC players
AEK Larnaca FC players
Association football defenders
Doxa Katokopias FC players
Olympiakos Nicosia players